Iraqi State Company for Maritime Transport is the Iraqi national maritime transportation company. It is one of the departments of the Iraqi Ministry of Transportation.

The company was established in 1952.

External links 

 

Companies of Iraq
Shipping companies of Iraq
1952 establishments in Iraq
Transport companies established in 1952